Port Natal High School (known to the students of the school as Porties) is a public co-ed high school for Afrikaans speaking learners. The school is located in Umbilo, a middle class suburb of Durban, KwaZulu-Natal, South Africa. It was founded in 1941 and is home to over 700 students from Grade 1 – 12.

Port Natal High School is one of the few remaining Afrikaans-medium schools in the greater Ethekweni area. Slogans associated with the school are "die Bastion vir Afrikaans in Durban" or "die Vlagskip van Afrikanerdom in Durban".

External links
Port Natal High School

Educational institutions established in 1941
Schools in KwaZulu-Natal
Afrikaans-language schools
High schools in South Africa
1941 establishments in South Africa